The list of shipwrecks in the 1st millennium includes some ships sunk, wrecked or otherwise lost between 1 January AD 1 and 31 December AD 1000, of the Julian calendar.

 to 100 AD
 A Roman ship sank near Fiscardo, Cephalonia in the Ionian Sea. The wreck could be carrying as many as 6000 amphorae.
 
c. 40
 An Obelisk ship caught fire while on display at the Puteoli harbour during Caligula’s reign (36 – 41 AD).

42
 Two ships used as floating palaces were intentionally sunk on Lake Nemi after the death of Caligula.

c. 50
 An Obelisk ship was purposely sunk by the emperor Claudius to build Portus harbour.

c. 60
 The Madrague de Giens is a 40 m Roman cargo ship, lying in 18 to 20 metres of water off the coast of the small fishing port of La Madrague de Giens, on the Giens Peninsula, east of Toulon.

c. 280
 A Gallo-Roman ship caught fire and sank in the harbour at Saint Peter Port, Guernsey. Discovered in 1982 by Richard Keen, a local diver, the ship was raised between 1984 and 1987 by the Guernsey Maritime Trust. Some of the artifacts are on show at Castle Cornet.

c. 570
 A Byzantine ship carrying marble columns and anchors sank off the island of Ekinlik, in the Sea of Marmara, Turkey. The wreck was found by sonar in 1997.

622
Conaing mac Áedáin, a member of the Dál Riata royal family, is drowned when his currach sinks in the waters off Ireland; a poem in the Annals of Ulster commemorates the event.

641
Shipwreck experienced by the monastic community of Iona. 

c. 666
 St Wilfrith stranded on the coast of Sussex.

737
A ship sinks in the North Channel with the loss of Faílbe son of Guaire, coarb of the church at Apor Crosán (Applecross, Scotland), and 22 sailors.

756
Wreck (Latin naufragium) of a fleet of 30 (or 27) boats belonging to the Dealbhna Nuadhat kingdom on Lough Ree, Ireland; only one crew survived.

c. 830
 An Arab dhow carrying a valuable cargo, from China to Africa, including ceramics from Changsha, spice jars, ewers, inkwells, funeral urns and gilt-silver boxes was wrecked off Belitung, Sumatra. The Belitung shipwreck also known as the ″Tang shipwreck" or "Tang treasure ship″ was discovered in 1998 by sea cucumber divers.

877
 (First report) — Danish fleet: Loss of 120 galleys at Swanage, following an agreement with King Alfred to leave Wessex. Reports differ as to whether loss was due to a storm or fog.

886
 A number of Danish war galleys were sunk at the mouth of the River Orwell during clashes between King Alfred and the Danish Vikings.

924
 A Viking fleet is reported to have been wrecked in Dundrum with the loss of around nine hundred lives.

References

1
Shipwrecks
Shipwrecks, 0001